Migo may refer to:

People
Hisao Migo (1900–1985), Japanese botanist
Migo Adecer (born 1999), Filipino-Australian singer

Other uses
Mi-Go, a fictional race of extraterrestrials created by H. P. Lovecraft
Migo (company), a Taiwanese company
Migo, a main character in the movie Small Foot
Migo, a Talmudic principle
Migo Island, Torbay, Western Australia
Migos, American hip hop trio